Esenköy may refer to:

 Koilanemos, a village in Cyprus whose Turkish name is Esenköy
 , a town in Turkey
 Esenköy, İnegöl
 Esenköy, Nazilli, a village in Turkey
 , a village in Turkey
 Esenköy, Savaştepe, a village
 Esenköy, Yenipazar, a village in Turkey
 Esenköy, Zonguldak, a village in Turkey

See also